Freminaevia is a genus of fungi within the Melanconidaceae family.

References

Melanconidaceae